Zerguinho Maikel Deira (born 23 July 2002) is a Surinamese professional footballer who plays as a defensive midfielder and defender for SVB Eerste Divisie club Transvaal and the Suriname national team.

Club career 
Deira joined Transvaal at the age of four. He made his debut for the first team at the age of sixteen.

International career 
On 13 October 2018, Deira made his debut for Suriname in a 5–0 win against the British Virgin Islands. In doing so, he became the youngest player in the history of the Suriname national team, at the age of sixteen.

References

External links 
 

Living people
2002 births
Surinamese footballers
Sportspeople from Paramaribo
Association football midfielders
Association football defenders
S.V. Transvaal players
Suriname international footballers
Suriname under-20 international footballers
Suriname youth international footballers